Ecce Homo is a subject of a series of oil on panel paintings by Andrea Solari, dating to between 1505 and 1510. Its hands show the influence of Solari's master Leonardo da Vinci and particularly his Lady with an Ermine.

List of versions
Museo Poldi Pezzoli, Milan, oil on panel, 43x33 cm, c. 1505-1506
Ashmolean Museum, Oxford, 57x44 cm, c.1505-1507 - shows Christ holding the rod with which he is about to be flogged
National Museum, Warsaw, 61.8x50.2 cm, 1505-1510 - shows Christ wearing a purple cloak, unlike the red cloak of the other versions 
Private collection, Brescia, 61x50 cm, c.1505-1510

References

Solari
Paintings in the collection of the Museo Poldi Pezzoli
Paintings in the collection of the Ashmolean Museum
Paintings in the collection of the National Museum, Warsaw
1500s paintings